Creswell John Eastman  (born 30 March 1940) is the Clinical Professor of Medicine at Sydney University Medical School, Principal of the Sydney Thyroid Clinic and Consultant Emeritus to the Westmead Hospital. Eastman is an endocrinologist and has directed or conducted research and public health projects into elimination of iodine deficiency disorders (IDD) in Malaysia, Indonesia, Laos, Cambodia, Thailand, several Pacific Islands, Hong Kong, China and Tibet and Australia. For his work in remote areas of China, he has been dubbed the "man who saved a million brains".

In 2013 Eastman expressed concern that IDD may be affecting Australian children's ability to perform at school and reiterated that view in 2016. While the initial focus was mostly on indigenous children, he recently expanded it to include all children.

Early life and education 

Eastman was born on 30 March 1940 in Narrandera, New South Wales. He is the fourth child of Albert Edward and Margaret Mary Eastman. He gained his primary education at Woodburn and Lismore in Northern NSW and secondary schooling at Marist Brothers Boarding School in Bowral/ Mittagong, NSW. He studied medicine at the University of Sydney, graduating as a Bachelor of Medicine, Bachelor of Surgery(MBBS) in 1965 and was awarded his Doctorate of Medicine (MD) by research thesis in 1980.

Medical career 

Eastman started his medical career in 1965 and was admitted as a member of the Royal Australasian College of Physicians (MRACP) in 1969 and became a fellow (FRACP) in 1974.

From 1965 to 1966 Eastman was Resident Medical Officer at St Vincent's Hospital and Medical Registrar at the same hospital from 1968 to 1969. In 1967 he became a Research Fellow in Endocrinology at the Garvan Institute of Medical Research and between 1969 and 1970 was a Research Fellow of The Asthma Foundation of New South Wales also at The Garvan Institute of Medical Research.

Eastman was awarded the Overseas Travelling Fellowship of the Royal Australasian College of Physicians (RACP) and the Searle Travel Grant in Endocrinology in 1971 and worked as a Research Fellow and Honorary Physician, Institute of Clinical Research and Institute of Nuclear Medicine, The Middlesex Hospital Medical School, London, UK from 1971 to 1972.

In 1973 he returned to Australia to become Assistant Director of the Garvan Institute of Medical Research at St Vincent's Hospital, Sydney, a position he retained until 1975. He was concurrently a Senior Research Officer with the National Health and Medical Research Council (NH&MRC); Honorary Clinical Assistant at the Endocrine Clinic, Royal Alexandra Hospital for Children, Sydney; Visiting Clinical Endocrinologist at St Margaret's Hospital, Sydney; and Clinical Tutor, Faculty of Medicine, University of New South Wales.

In 1975 Eastman was appointed Director (Foundation Head) of the Department of Endocrinology and Diabetes at Woden Valley and Canberra Hospitals, Canberra ACT; a position he held until 1979 when he returned to Sydney to become Senior Staff Specialist Endocrinology and Foundation Head Endocrine Unit, (Department of Endocrinology and Diabetes) Westmead Hospital until 1989. From 1986 to 1989 he was also Deputy Director Division of Medicine, Westmead Hospital.

In 1989 Eastman became director, Institute of Clinical Pathology and Medical Research (ICPMR), Westmead Hospital and Consultant Physician in Endocrinology, Westmead Hospital and was appointed Professor of Medicine and Pathology in the University of Sydney. He was responsible for developing a networked Pathology service for the public hospitals of Western Sydney (Westmead, Blacktown, Mt Druitt and Nepean) and ultimately regional and rural services for North West and Western NSW. In 1997 Eastman was appointed Government Analyst and Director of the Division of Analytical Laboratories (DAL) at Lidcombe providing public health and forensic laboratory services for the state of NSW, a position he held concurrently with Director of the ICPMR.

In 2006 Eastman retired as Director of the ICPMR and his concurrent roles as the Director Western Area Pathology Service (1993–2006) and Government Analyst and Director Division of Analytical Laboratories (1997–2006).

Eastman continues as Clinical Professor of Medicine/Pathology at the University of Sydney, a position he has held since 1990, and Consultant Emeritus at Westmead Hospital.

In association with Dr Ian Hales from Sydney and Dr Shigenobu Nagataki from Japan, Eastman was the initiator of the movement to establish an Asia Oceania Thyroid Association and has held numerous positions within this organisation. He has been the Treasurer, an Executive Councillor and President (1980–1982) of the Endocrine Society of Australia and is a life member. He has been Member and Chairman of the National Health & Medical Research Council (NH&MRC) Regional Grants Committees and has held numerous positions with the Royal Australasian College of Physicians (RACP). He was a foundation member of the board of directors of Westmead Hospital Medical Research Institute/Foundation and held numerous other senior positions within the hospital. Eastman was also a senior adviser and has been a board member, since 2001, of the International Council on Control of Iodine Deficiency Disorders (ICCIDD), now rebadged as the Iodine Global Network (IGN). He is the chairman of the management committee, Australian Centre for Control of Iodine Deficiency Disorders (ACCIDD).

Controlling and preventing IDD 

When teaching students, Eastman explains that the average person only needs a teaspoon of iodine over his or her whole life. However, it is needed in microgram doses every day and it is particularly important for pregnant and lactating women as they supply the necessary iodine to the developing foetus and newborn baby. Even mild Iodine deficiency can cause goitres and decreased IQ. Severe iodine deficiency can likely lead to cretinism if it occurs in a child's early development.

Malaysia 

Eastman's research into IDD within specific populations started in the late 1970s when he and Dr Glen Maberly visited remote parts of Sarawak, Malaysia where a large percentage of the villagers had goitres. The research was focused on determining the cause, and iodine deficiency was identified. To confirm their diagnosis the research team organised to have tiny doses of iodine introduced into the water being delivered to the village long houses. After 12 months the goitres in children had disappeared, proving iodine deficiency was the problem. Subsequently, the Malaysian government regulated that only iodized salt could be imported into Sarawak and the problem was thought to have been eliminated. A 2008 study published in 2013 found that only 46% of salt in Sarawak has been iodized and while rural children had a lower goitre incidence rate, the study "revealed that the population in Sarawak were of borderline iodine sufficient with mild IDD seen in rural areas". A study from 1998 continues to advocate for the introduction of iodine into water.

China 

In the early 1980s it was estimated that 25% (250 to 300 million people) of the Chinese population was suffering from goitre and millions more had some level of mental retardation. Once the problem and solution had been identified, the Chinese Government moved to have all salt iodized. Since then the goitre rate is down to 5% and no new cretins have been recognised in recent years.

During his first visit to the Tibet Autonomous Region, Eastman discovered that 13% of the population was afflicted with cretinism which he believed was a result of severe Iodine Deficiency. With the support of the Australian International Development Assistance Bureau (AIDAB, now AusAID) Eastman, assisted by Dr Mu Li, led a highly successful multimillion-dollar Australian Overseas Aid project in China, between 1985 and 1992, aimed at controlling and preventing iodine deficiency disorders in rural Chinese populations. Eastman's work in China continued after the end of the aid program. He has been an International Consultant in Endemic Diseases to the Ministry of Public Health of the People's Republic of China and Honorary Professor of Medicine in Tianjin Medical College. He holds a similar consultant appointment to the Tibet Autonomous Region. In a radio interview in 2015 Eastman noted that an independent survey in Tibet around 2010 found no new cases of cretinism in children under 5 years old as a result of an iodized oil and iodized salt program introduced in 2000.

Thailand 

Thailand has identified iodine deficiency and has implemented programs to have iodized salt (universal salt iodization) within the country. However, with shifting priorities, the effectiveness of programs can change and in 2004 the director-general of the Department of Health of the Ministry of Health, Thailand, requested the Network for the Sustained Elimination of Iodine Deficiency to undertake an external review of the Thai IDD programme, which was led by Eastman. This program developed numerous recommendations in program policy and management: salt production and iodization; monitoring, surveillance and quality assurance; advocacy and communication. In 2006 the National IDD Control Board (NIDDCB) met, presided over by Princess Maha Chakri Sirindhorn to develop an IDD 5 Year Master Plan based on the 2004 report. In 2009 a review of the master plan was undertaken. While progress had been made, universal salt iodization remained a problem and 17 additional recommendations were made. A further review was completed in 2013. For his work in assisting in the elimination of IDD in Thailand Eastman was awarded the 2014 Health Promotion Princess Award.

Polynesia and Micronesia 

Eastman has instigated or participated in a number of studies within Polynesia and Micronesia. Although it is generally thought that people close to the sea are less likely to suffer from IDD, studies have identified iodine deficiency in these islands. In a study published in 2008 the children on the island of Tanna in Vanuatu were shown to suffer from moderate iodine deficiency. Only 40% of the children on Tanna ate fish on a weekly basis and only 30% ate fresh fish, which is insufficient to ensure an adequate daily iodine intake. Papua New Guinea has had a universal salt iodization strategy since 1995 and the results of a study published in 2008 found that iodine deficiency was not a major a problem but some issues were found in breastfeeding mothers. A survey in Samoa in 2015 showed probable iodine deficiency in women and Samoa does not have mandatory iodization of salt.

Australia 

Eastman and others undertook the National Iodine Nutrition Survey from 2003 to 2005 in Australia, confirming that iodine deficiency has re-emerged in Australia. However, for logistical reasons the Northern Territory was not included. As a result of this study, legislation made it mandatory to use iodized salt in all bread made in Australia, (excluding "organic bread") from September 2009. While Eastman agrees that the addition of iodized salt to bread has helped the situation he remains very concerned about the iodine intake of Australian pregnant and lactating women and also for the inhabitants of remote communities in the Northern Territory and NW Western Australia.

Eastman is passionate about the need to ensure that pregnant or lactating women have sufficient iodine in their diet.

His preferred method of delivery for pregnant and lactating women is via oral iodine supplements. In his day to day practice at the Sydney Thyroid Clinic he will give priority to pregnant women. Eastman's work in China indicates that adequate iodine intake has resulted in an overall increase in the national IQ. He is of the opinion that recent testing of children in Australia that showed a decline in results in Australian children may be caused by iodine deficiency. This was a problem that he previously flagged in 2007: "If we don't address this in Australia then we are likely to see a lot of children born in coming years that have lower IQs, have problems with hearing, have great learning difficulties and they are less likely to fulfill their genetic potential."

Awards and recognition
 Little Shop Research Fellow, St. Vincent's Hospital, Sydney
 1970–1971 Overseas Travelling Fellowship in Clinical Medicine and The Allied Sciences of the Royal Australasian College of Physicians
 1982 Otsuka Gold Medal Research Award of the Asia Oceania Thyroid Association
 1988 Australian International Development Assistance Bureau (AIDAB) Bicentennial Award for Excellence in Overseas Aid project (1988) with G.F. Maberly
 1994 Government Technology Productivity Silver Award (1994) for implementation of the Cerner PathNet Laboratory Information System in Westmead Hospital (Project Director: C.J. Eastman)
 1994 Eastman was awarded Membership of the Order of Australia for his contributions to Medicine, particularly in the field of Endocrinology
 1998 Honorary Professor of Medicine Tianjin University Medical College, Tianjin, People's Republic of China 
 2000 Patron and Principal Medical Adviser of the Australian Thyroid Foundation 
 2003 Made Life Member of the Endocrine Association of Australia.
 2003 NSW Finalist: “Senior Australian of the Year”
 2004 Eastman honoured by Princess Maha Chakri Sirindhorn at a special ceremony in the Chitralada Palace, Bangkok for services to the improvement of the health of the people of Thailand.
 2006 AMA National Award for Excellence in Health Care delivery
 2008 University of Sydney Alumni Award for Professional Excellence
 2011 Peter Heiman Plenary Lecture International Association of Endocrine Surgeons Yokohama Japan
 2018 Officer of the Order of Australia for "distinguished service to medicine, particularly to the discipline of pathology, through leadership roles, to medical education, and as a contributor to international public health projects."
2019 Distinguished Service Award of the AOTA (Asia and Oceania Thyroid Association) for " his distinguished contributions to clinical and laboratory thyroidology, his work to establish and support AOTA, his regional and international work in the epidemiology and eradication of iodine deficiency disease (IDD), and his mentoring of colleagues to develop and contribute to clinical thyroidology in our region."

Personal life 
Eastman is married to Annette, whom he met while a medical student, and has four children Katherine (Kate), born 1966; Damien, born 1968; Phillipa, born 1970 and Nicholas, born 1974.

References

Further reading 
The following references relate in the main to the discussion above. More detailed lists can be found in Google Scholar and PubMed.

 
 
 Eastman, CJ. and Corcoran, JM., 1979 Measurement of Thyroid Hormones and Diagnostic Usefulness, In – Current Thyroid Problems in Southeast Asia & Oceania, Eds B. Hetzel, M. Wellby and R. Hoschl, p 109-113. Maberly, GF., Eastman, CJ. and Corcoran, JM., 1979, Thyroid Hormone Response to Thyrotrophin Stimulation in Subjects from Endemic Goitre Regions of Sarawak, Malaysia, Aust. & N.Z. J. Med. 9:385.
 Maberly, GF. and Eastman, CJ., 1979, Endemic Goitre in Sarawak, Malaysia II, In – Current Thyroid Problems in Southeast Asia & Oceania, Eds B.S. Hetzel, M.L. Wellby and R. Hoschl, p 21-28.
 Maberly, GF., Eastman, CJ. and Corcoran, JM., 1981, Effect of Iodination of a Village Water Supply in Sarawak, Malaysia on Goitre Size and Thyroid Function, Lancet 2:1270–1271.
 Maberly, GF., Eastman, CJ., Waite, KV., Corcoran, JM. and Rashford, V., 1983,  The Role of Cassava in Endemic Goitre in Sarawak, Malaysia, Current Problems in Thyroid Research, In : Proceedings 2nd Asia and Oceania Thyroid Association, Excerpta Medica I.C.S. Eds. N. Ui, K. Torizuka, S. Nagataki, K. Miya 605: 341–344.
 Eastman CJ., 1986, Clinical Problems in Thyroid Disease – A Review, In : Frontiers in Thyroidology, Eds : G. Medeiros-Neto and E. Gaitan Vol. 1:139–142.
 Maberly, GF., Boyages, S., Mu, L., Eastman, C., Morris, J., Jupp, J., Collins, J., Qidong, Q., Peiyang, Z., Chengyi, Q and Derun, L., 1987, Intellectual Deficits Persist in an Iodine Deficient Population in China given Iodised Salt and Oil Prophylaxis, Editors : A. Vichayanrat, W. Nitayanant, C. Eastman and S. Nagataki In : Recent Progress In Thyroidology p 407-412.
 Li, M, Qu, C., Qian, Q., Liu, D., Peiyang, Z., Zhang, C., Wang, H., Jia, Q,. Eastman, CJ., Boyages, S,. Collins, JK., Jupp, JJ. and Maberly, GF.,1987, Endemic Goitre in Central China caused by Excessive Iodine Intake, Lancet 2:257–259.
 Collins, JK,. Jupp, JJ., Maberly, GF., Morris, JG. and Eastman, CJ., 1987, An Explanatory Study of Intellectual Functioning of Neurological and Myxedematous Cretins in China, Aust. J. Developmental Disabilities 13:13–20.
 Li, M., Boyages, SC., Liu, DR,. Qian, QD., Zhang, CD., Wang, HX., Jia, QA., Yang, YY., Maberly, GF. and Eastman, CJ., 1988, Further Studies of Endemic Goitre In Central China Caused By Excess Iodine Intake, Life Sciences: Experimental and Clinical Endocrinology 7: 165–167.
 Boyages, SC., Halpern, JP., Maberly, GF., Eastman, CJ., Morris, JG., Collins, JK., Jupp, JJ., Jin, C., Wang ZH. and You, CY., 1988, A Comparative Study of Neurological and Myxoedematous Cretinism in Western China, J. Clin. Endocrinol Metabolism 67:6 1262 – 1271.
 Halpern, JP., Morris, JG., Boyages, SC., Maberly, GF., Eastman, CJ., Jin, C., Wang, ZL., Lim, JL., Yu, D. and You, C., 1989, Neurological Aspects of Cretinism in Qinghai Province China In: "Iodine and the Brain" Ed: G. Robert Delong, Jacob Robbins and Peter Condliffe. Plenum Publishing Corporation pp239–247.
 Boyages, SC., Maberly, GF., Collins, JK., and Eastman, CJ., 1988,  Iodised Oil Injections Fail to Benefit myxoedematous Cretins from Qinghai Province, China.        Elsevier – Excerpta Medica Amsterdam ICS 796:329–332.
 Boyages, SC., Maberly, GF., Halpern, JP., Morris, JG., Collins, JK., and Eastman, CJ., 1988,  Features of Endemic Cretinism and Qinghai Province, China, Elsevier – Excerpta Medica Amsterdam ICS 796:311–314.
 Boyages, SC., Collins, JK., Maberly, GF., Jupp, JJ., Morris, J., Eastman, CJ., Liu, D., Qian, Q., Zhang, P. and Qu, C., 1989, Iodine Deficiency Impairs Intellectual and Neuromotor Development in Apparently Normal People : A Study of Rural Inhabitants from North Central China, Med. J. Australia  150: 676- 682.
 Eastman, CJ., 1992, Total Quality Management: the challenge for hospitals in the 1990s, Med. J. Aust.  157: 219–220.
 Eastman, CJ., 1983, The Status of Iodine Nutrition in Australia, In: Iodine Deficiency in Europe: A Continuing Concern. Eds. F.Delange and D.Glinoer.pp. 133–139. Plenum Publishing Corporation New York.
 Eastman, CJ., and L.Fulop, 1996, Total Quality Management: Panacea or Placebo for Hospital Management Int’l Journal of Public Admin Vol. 19 (11&12) pp 2141–2166.
 Eastman, CJ.,1999, Iodine Deficiency Disorders in China – overcoming a massive public health problem, Today’s Life Science 11:20 – 24.
 
 Ma, Guttikonda, K., Boyages, SC., and Eastman, CJ., 2001, The Re-emergence of iodine deficiency in Australia. Mu Li, Gary Asia Pacific Journal of Clinical Nutrition. 10:200-2003.
 Eastman, CJ. and Li, M., 2004, IDD in Tibet. Reports from the Regions and Countries. In: Towards the Global Elimination of Brain Damage due to Iodine Deficiency. Eds. Hetzel BS, Delange F, Dunn J, Ling J, Mannar V, and Pandav C. Chapter 4. pp 396–407.
 Eastman, CJ., 2004, IDD in the Asia Pacific Region: Progress and Problems. In: Towards the Global Elimination of Brain damage due to Iodine Deficiency: Eds. Hetzel BS, Delange F, Dunn J, Ling J, Mannar V, and Pandav C. Chapter 5; pp410 to 422.
 
 Eastman, CJ., and Li, M., 2004, Towards IID elimination in Tibet – then and now. IDD Newsletter. pp 38–41
 
 
 
 Eastman, CJ. and Li, M., 2007, Iodine Deficiency Disorders in the Asia Pacific Region. Hot Thyroidology: www.hotthyroidology.com September 2007, No 3.
 
 
 
 Li, M., Zupei Chen, Z. and Eastman, CJ., 2009, Healthcare Service Delivery in achieving Sustained Elimination of IDD: a Case Study in China. In Comprehensive Handbook of Iodine Chapter 85; 825–834.
 Eastman, CJ., and Michael B Zimmermann, MB., 2009, Iodine Deficiency Disorders. In "Thyroid Disease Manager". www.thyroidmanager.org chapter 20.
 Sivlay, P., Vatnana, CP., Oeurn, US., Gerasimov, G and Eastman, CJ., 2009, Cambodia closes in on IDD elimination; IDD Newsletter Vol 32: 1–4.
 Eastman, CJ., 2009, Tracking Progress Towards Sustainable elimination of IDD in Thailand, IDD Newsletter Vol 34: 6–9.
 Temple, VJ., Oge, R., Daphne, I., Vince, JD., Ripa, P., Delange, F. and Eastman, CJ., 2011, Salt iodization and Iodine status among infants and lactating mothers in Papua New Guinea, African Journal of Food Agriculture Nutrition and Development Vol 9 No 9.
 
 Eastman, CJ., 2010, Iodine deficiency in Australian children. Paediatrics and Child Health in General Practice Vol 8:16.
 
 Li, M., and Eastman, CJ., 2012, The changing epidemiology of iodine deficiency. Nature Reviews in Endocrinology.

External links
 University of Sydney 
 Asia and Oceania Thyroid Association
 Iodine Global Network
 Australian Thyroid Foundation

Living people
1940 births
Australian endocrinologists
Medical doctors from Sydney
Australian medical researchers
Australian scientists
Fellows of the Royal Australasian College of Physicians
Officers of the Order of Australia
Academic staff of the University of Sydney
University of Sydney alumni